Sidney Jacobson may refer to:
Sydney Jacobson, Baron Jacobson (1908–1988), British journalist
Sidney Jacobson (businessman) (1918–2005), American founder of MSC Industrial Direct
Sid Jacobson (1929-2022), American writer